Mary Quinn may refer to:
 Mary Alice Quinn, girl from Chicago, Illinois, described as "Chicago's Miracle Child" and "Chicago's Unofficial Saint"
 Mary Ellen Quinn, American librarian